J. Marcel Duval, CMM, CD is a retired Canadian Forces Air Command general.  His senior appointments were as the Commander of the 1 Canadian Air Division / Canadian NORAD Region and the Deputy Commander of NORAD.

Career
Duval was born in Baie-Saint-Paul, Quebec, Canada. He joined the Canadian Armed Forces (CAF) in 1975. After graduating from flight training in 1977, he specialized as a pilot of the CH-135 Twin Huey utility helicopter. On 30 January 2009, Duval was made a Commander of the Order of Military Merit.

Duval was appointed as Deputy Commander of the North American Aerospace Defense Command (NORAD) on 10 July 2009. He was previously Commander of the 1 Canadian Air Division / Canadian NORAD Region.

On 15 August 2011, Duval was succeeded as Deputy Commander by Thomas J. Lawson and retired from the Air Force.

References

External links

  NORAD Biography of Lieutenant-General J. M. (Marcel) Duval, CMM, CD (English)
  Canadian Forces Biography of Biography of Lieutenant-General J. M. (Marcel) Duval, CMM, CD (English)

Canadian Forces Air Command generals
Living people
People from Baie-Saint-Paul
Commanders of the Order of Military Merit (Canada)
Year of birth missing (living people)
Canadian military personnel from Quebec